Kandy Nehova (born 26 September 1946) is a Namibian politician. A member of the Rally for Democracy and Progress (RDP), Nehova was a member of the National Assembly of Namibia following the 2009 election. In September 2010, Nehova and eight other opposition politicians were sworn-in as members of the National Assembly following a six-month boycott due to electoral irregularities in the 2009 election.  The electoral irregularities were ruled by a court of law to be unfounded.

Career
Formerly a leading member of SWAPO, Nehova was the first Chairperson of the National Council of Namibia from 1993 to 2004. He represented Ongwediva. He resigned in November 2007 as a member of SWAPO, the same month as RDP founder Hidipo Hamutenya.

References

1946 births
Living people
People from Oshana Region
Members of the National Assembly (Namibia)
Chairpersons of the National Council (Namibia)
Rally for Democracy and Progress (Namibia) politicians
SWAPO politicians